"All I Want" is a song by Dublin-based alternative rock quartet Kodaline taken from their 2013 album In a Perfect World. It was released as the fourth single from the album topping at number 15 in the Irish Singles Chart. It also charted on the UK Singles Chart reaching #67.

Music video
The music video for the song was issued in 2 separate parts and was directed by Stevie Russell.

Oliver who is afflicted with a deformed face works in a company and is attracted to Mandy one of the co-workers, but she is cautious in developing any relation with him because of his deformity. In part 1 of the video, Oliver is bullied by 3 of his co-workers, who later on harass Mandy. But Oliver stands up for her, pushing them back. Mandy warms up to this fellow because of his defense of her against the bullies. In part 2, Oliver forgets to wear his tie while going to work. While getting his tie, his dog slips through the open door and gets lost. The dog wanders the streets and also passes by a street band (Kodaline) performing. Oliver discovers the loss of his dog when he returns home and immediately goes on a hunt to find his dog and Mandy helps him in printing the posters that he distributes all over the locality. He eventually finds his dog in a farm land outside his locality.

The director of the 2 videos Stevie Russell plays the main character Oliver with his love interest Mandy being played by Irish actress Amy De Bhrún. The bullies are played by James Cosgrave, Tristan McConnell and Ciaran O'Grady.

Use in other media
The song was featured in The Fault in Our Stars movie soundtrack as well as in the pilot of the E! television show The Royals.

It also featured in "Remember The Time", the second episode of the ninth season of Grey’s Anatomy, during Meredith's voice-mail to Cristina.

The song was also used in the fifth season of The Vampire Diaries.

A version of the song was used by Google in their Zeitgeist video released in December 2012.

The song was featured for Turner Classic Movies year end tribute for 2014 "TCM Remembers" which memorialized all of the entertainment personnel that died during the year.

The song was also used in the 2016 film Grimsby.

The song was featured during the "In Memorium" video of the 2021 Screen Actors Guild Awards

Weekly charts

Certifications

References

2014 singles
Kodaline songs
2013 songs
B-Unique Records singles
Songs written by James Flannigan (songwriter)